Fernanda Lavera is a neo-expressionist artist from Buenos Aires, Argentina. Lavera's artistic style was influenced by the street art scene and the Buenos Aires art community. Her art came to an international audience after being spotted by music producer and art collector Clive Davis, who came across Lavera's art during an exhibition that took place at the Palacio Duhau in Buenos Aires.

Influences/Styles 
Lavera states that she was influenced by Antonio Berni, an Argentinian Artist from the 1960s, who experimented with neo-figuration to speak about pressing social matters of the time. 

Lavera credits a family acquaintance with introducing her to art, providing her with brushes, canvases, and encouragement at a time that was important for her artistic development. Lavera has also spoken about being inspired by CoBra, a group of German artists who created neo-expressionist art after the fall of the Berlin wall. Lavera also stated that she takes inspiration from Basquiat, Picasso, and Paul Gauguin. Speaking about the inspiration of Basquiat, Lavera commented "The directness and primitivism of Basquiat echoes in me, as I tell histories of my beloved city with graffiti that speaks in a narrative context.”

Issues 
Lavera's abstract style touches upon social issues, particularly the mistreatment of women and gender violence.

Technique 
Lavera describes herself as a Neo-Expressionist. Her paintings occur primarily on large canvases. She often paints several works simultaneously. This allows for a consistent message to appear among works that are made during the same period.

Exhibitions & Displays

The Pharaoh and the Celtic Gods 
The solo exhibition The Pharaoh and the Celtic Gods took place in November 2021, in New York City at Gallery 23. It featured works she created during 2020 and 2021 and also saw the launch of the Sr. Freeck Sneaker collection.

Cheap Chat 
The solo exhibition, Cheap Chat took place in July 2022 at the G23NY gallery in New York. The exhibition was a reflection on the war in Ukraine. Lavera said that the exhibition critiqued how "people who talk about the war yet do nothing about it".

One Thousand Museum 
The artworks "Mind of Man" and "Dance with the Devil" decorate the apartment of footballer David Beckham at the One Thousand Museum in Miami, a building designed by Zaha Hadid.

Reception 
Record producer and art collector Clive Davis encountered Lavera's work during a visit to Buenos Aires in 2016 when he came across Lavera's work during an exhibition that took place at Palacio Duhau, stating "I immediately felt her enormous talent… a second-generation neo-expressionist with a very special feminine twist, Lavera is the real deal. I love her art and the stories behind her art."

Artist and art critic Bruce Helander stated that "it is impossible not to appreciate the artist’s exceptional style that is propelling this talented artist into a genuine art world contender." He described Lavera as having "an ingeniously coded abstract visual message Fernanda carries a distinguished badge of courage and responsibility as a communicator for social justice as well as following an honored tradition of artists who know that “every picture tells a story." Helander also acknowledged Lavera as having "a distinctive style that combines her colorful Argentinian background, with its vivid influences and rhythmic sensibility, into a strong idiosyncratic neo-expressionist statement with a complex pictorial language that paraphrases juxtapositions of harmony and aesthetic principles of multiplicity."

References

21st-century Argentine women artists
Neo-expressionist artists